Trešnjevka – sjever ("Trešnjevka – north") is one of the districts of Zagreb, Croatia. It is located in the western part of the city and has 55,425 inhabitants according to the 2011 census.

The district encompasses the northern part of the traditional Trešnjevka neighbourhood, separated from the southern part by the Zagrebačka Avenue.

List of neighborhoods in Trešnjevka – sjever
 Ciglenica
 Ljubljanica
 Pongračevo
 Remiza / Vurovčica
 Rudeš
 Stara Trešnjevka
 Ivan Starčević (Voltino)

References

Districts of Zagreb
Sjever